Bainton as a place may refer to:

Bainton, Cambridgeshire, England
Bainton, East Riding of Yorkshire, England
Bainton, Oxfordshire, England
Bainton Road, Oxford, England

Bainton as a surname may refer to:

Edgar Bainton (1880-1956), English composer
Neil Bainton (born 1970), English cricket umpire
Roland Bainton (1894-1984), English church historian